Diporiphora pallida, the pale two-pored dragon, is a species of agama found in the Kimberley region of  Western Australia.

References

Diporiphora
Agamid lizards of Australia
Taxa named by Paul Doughty
Taxa named by Paul Horner (herpetologist)
Taxa named by Jane Melville
Taxa named by Katie Smith Date
Reptiles described in 2019